Asarsi Getu or Asarsi Getu-Sahla-Gramai (Geina, Ethiopia, 1958) is an Israeli nurse of Beta Israel origin, who in the mid- 80s served as a nurse for the Red Cross refugee camps in Sudan. She saved the lives of many patients, secretly giving medicines to those who could not purchase them, and was responsible for distributing aid funds to Jewish refugees fleeing Ethiopia on their way to Israel.

Early years
Asarsi was born in the village of Geina in the province of Gondar in 1958, the youngest of ten children. Her father, Sahlo Getu, was a farmer and head of the local community, which numbered 58 Jewish families. In the 1960s, a Jewish school was opened in the village by Yona Bogale. Contrary to popular belief in Ethiopia at the time, Asarsi's father was persuaded to send not only his sons but also his daughters to school. After four years of schooling in the village, Asarsi refused to marry and persuaded her parents to allow her to complete 12 years of schooling in the city of Azezo. She continued her studies at the School of Nursing in Debre Tabor.

Career
After completing her training as a nurse in 1983, the authorities decided to send her to work on the Asmara front, where battles were fought between the Eritrean rebels and the army, as part of the Ethiopian Civil War. On the advice of her family, Asarsi joined one of the groups that set out on a journey to Israel via Sudan, the only one from her family and the entire village that set out on the journey at this stage. Along the way, her skills as a nurse were often required to care for the participants in the journey, including infants, the elderly and pregnant women.

Refugee Camps in Sudan
In 1984, the group crossed the border from Ethiopia into Sudan and reached the Wad al-Hilu refugee camp, near El-Gadarif. The refugees were suffering from a shortage of food and clean water, many diseases, a lack of medical services, and harassment by the locals. Many Ethiopian Jews were killed in refugee camps in Sudan while waiting to immigrate to Israel. Asarsi appealed to the Red Cross to volunteer for the organization. After proving her professional skills, she was accepted as a full-time nurse. As part of her work, she cared for many refugees, of all faiths, but especially Jewish refugees, whom other staff members refused to treat because of their religion. At her request, she was also assigned to work in the refugee camp clinic's pharmacy, a position that allowed her to help Jews who were unable to purchase the medicines they needed. Risking her life, she secretly gave patients free medicine, and sometimes bought medicines for them out of her own pocket money. Fearing that she would be abducted by local Sudanese and forced to marry, Asarsi decided to marry a Jewish bachelor, whom she had known before she arrived at the camp. Following her meeting with Henry Gould, one of the founders of the NGO Canadian Physicians for Aid and Relief (CPAR), Asarsi began assisting in the distribution of aid funds to Jewish families in the refugee camp. This activity was stopped after she received threats from refugees who were not found eligible for assistance, and a warning that the camp would be closed by the Sudanese authorities following her activities. In 1985, after the entire Beta Israel community in the Wad al-Hilu camp emigrated to Israel as part of Operation Moses, Asarsi also decided to leave Sudan. She wanted to leave for Israel, but the route to Israel was blocked following a leak to the press about the immigration of Jews. With the help of Ethiopian Jewish activists working for the Mossad, she received assistance from the Canadian Embassy in Sudan. Asarsi, who was in advanced pregnancy, gave birth to her daughter at a hospital in Khartoum, and about a month later, in May 1985, she arrived with her family in Canada.

Life in Canada and Aliyah
Asarsi began studying medicine in Winnipeg, but due to the imprisonment of two of her brothers, who were aliyah activists in Gondar, she was forced to drop out of medical school and work to help support her family back in Ethiopia. She was hired at a local hospital as a night-shift nurse, and later worked as a secretary. In her spare time, she has helped raise funds for the Ethiopian Jewry from the local Jewish community. At the same time, she raised her daughter herself, after divorcing her husband. After a five-year effort, she managed to bring her mother from Ethiopia to Canada; her mother later immigrated to Israel, her two brothers were released from the Ethiopian prison with the help of the Mossad, immigrated to Israel and were recognized as Prisoners of Zion. About a year later, in 1992, she immigrated to Israel with her daughter. In Israel, she met Baruch Garmai, whom she had known in Ethiopia. The two are married and live in Jerusalem. Asarsi continues to work as a nurse, while Garmai worked as a security guard at the Knesset until his retirement.

Honors
On the Memorial Day for Ethiopian Jews who perished on their way to Israel, which was held in Jerusalem in 2018, a meeting was held between Asarsi and one of the babies she rescued in Sudan - Yassu Zallo, and his parents Ashgere and Varkanu Zallo.
Asarsi was chosen as the "heroine of Israeli society" at a conference on female leadership in the Ethiopian-Israeli community, held by the Yerusalem Forum.
In the book "Trailblazing Leadership", published by the Yerusalem Forum, a chapter was devoted to her story.

References

Beta Israel
Wartime nurses
Ethiopian Jews
1958 births
Living people
People from Azezo